Hamengkubuwono II (also spelled Hamengkubuwana II, 7 March 1750 – 3 January 1828), born Raden Mas Sundoro, was the second sultan of Yogyakarta 1792–1810, 1811–12 and finally 1826–28 during the Java War.

He succeeded his father, Hamengkubuwono I who died in 1792. After Daendels pressured him, in December 1810, he was forced to abdicate in favour of his son, Raden Mas Surojo who was made the new sultan, under the name Hamengkubuwono III. However, nearly one year later, in 1811, the English under Stamford Raffles restored him to the throne. However, due to his aggressive behaviour towards the English, six months later in June 1812, he was deposed and exiled to Penang. He returned to Java in 1815, but in 1817, deeming him as a threat, he was exiled for the second time by the Dutch, this time to Ambon.

In 1826, the Dutch decided to return him from exile and restored him as the sultan. His third reign coincided with the Java War. On 3 January 1828, he died. He was succeeded by his great-grandson, Hamengkubuwono V. He was buried in Kotagede instead of the royal graveyard of Imogiri, due to the turbulence at the time.

Notes

See also
u Herman Willem Daendelsendels wono

Sultans of Yogyakarta
1750 births
1828 deaths
Indonesian royalty